Collaborative Care is a healthcare philosophy and movement focussed on a systematised way of managing care and treatment for people with chronic conditions.  Related ideas include: Integrated care, Primary Care Behavioral Health, Integrated care systems, and shared care.  There are many studies establishing the long-term clinical and cost-effectiveness of collaborative care for people with physical–mental comorbidity.  Nearly half of all people with a diagnosable mental health problem also have a long-term physical condition.

The Agency for Healthcare Research and Quality (AHRQ) published an overview of many different models and the research that supports them in 2008.  The key features of Collaborative Care models are:
Integration of mental health professionals in primary care medical settings
Close collaboration between mental health and medical/nursing providers
Focus on treating the person and family.

Four key components were indentified by Ramanju and Pincus in 2019:
a multiprofessional approach to patient care;
a structured management plan tailored to the individual needs of the patient;
proactive follow-up delivering evidence-based treatments;
processes to enhance interprofessional communication such as routine and regular team meetings and/or shared records.

According to Shivam Shah collaborative care is a form of systematic team-based care involving:
A case manager responsible for the coordination of different components of care;
A structured care management plan, shared with the patient;
Systematic patient management based on protocols and the tracking of outcomes;
Delivery of care by a multidisciplinary team which includes a psychiatrist;
Collaboration between primary and secondary care.

There are organisations in many countries promoting these ideas such as the American Collaborative Family Healthcare Association,  a multi-guild member association based in Chapel Hill, North Carolina, which supports healthcare professionals in integrating physical and behavioral health.  The University of Washington has an Advancing Integrated Mental Health Solutions Center, founded by Jürgen Unützer, to promote primary care behavioral health.

The Coalition for Collaborative Care was established in England in 2014.  It focuses on re-framing the relationship between a person with long-term health conditions and the professionals supporting them.

See also 
Integrated care

References

Health care